Permafrost and Periglacial Processes is a quarterly peer-reviewed scientific journal covering research on permafrost and periglacial geomorphology. It covers the subject from various points of views including engineering, hydrology, process geomorphology, and quaternary geology. It is the official journal of the International Permafrost Association and is published by John Wiley & Sons. The editor-in-chief is Mauro Guglielmin (Insubria University, Italy). According to the Journal Citation Reports, the journal has a 2020 impact factor of 4.368.

See also
Biuletyn Peryglacjalny

References

External links

Arctic research
Earth and atmospheric sciences journals
Geomorphology journals
Soil science
Publications established in 1990
Quarterly journals
Wiley (publisher) academic journals
English-language journals